111 Eighth Avenue, also known as the Google Building and formerly known as Union Inland Terminal #1 and the Port Authority Building, is an Art Deco multi-use building in the Chelsea neighborhood of Manhattan, New York City. Fifteen stories tall and occupying an entire city block, it has  of floor space, more than the Empire State Building. It was built in 1932 by the Port of New York Authority to serve as an inland terminal for the Hudson River piers and as a warehousing and industrial facility. Occupancy fell to 50percent in the 1970s due to the decline of industrial activity in Manhattan, and the Port Authority itself moved to the World Trade Center in 1973. In the 1990s the building began to attract tenants in the technology and telecommunications sectors. In 2010, the building was purchased for $1.8 billion by Google, who became its largest tenant; Google's presence helped attract other technology companies to Chelsea and contributed to the neighborhood's ongoing gentrification. Aside from Google, the building is also home to a cancer treatment center and a black box theater.

Description 
111 Eighth Avenue occupies the full city block between Eighth and Ninth Avenues and 15th and 16th Streets in the Chelsea neighborhood of Manhattan, New York City. It has a rooftop helipad and penthouse floors on either end of the building. Its exterior is in the Art Deco style and features recurring seagull motifs. The walls are largely made of brick, with granite bases; the first two stories are limestone, and copings and finials are of terracotta. Various elements of the building's design are due to its original industrial purpose, including truck-sized freight elevators and floors built to support heavy loads. , two of its original truck elevators were still in use, in addition to nine other large freight elevators and fourteen passenger elevators. The floors of the two lobbies originally each had a large bronze seal of the Port Authority embedded in them; one of these was removed and converted into a coffee table as a retirement gift for Port Authority director Austin J. Tobin. It is also noted for its unobstructed views of the Manhattan skyline.

The building has direct access to the 14th Street/Eighth Avenue station of the New York City Subway.

History

Union Inland Terminal #1 and Port Authority Commerce Building 
By the early twentieth century, the West Side of Manhattan was plagued with heavy traffic because of the tangle of street-level passenger and freight trains on the West Side Line, cargo unloading from the busy Hudson River piers, and the lack of suitable warehouse facilities. The situation led the Port of New York Authority to commission the construction of a large inland terminal at 111 Eighth Avenue. It was designed to alleviate the traffic problem by streamlining the distribution of goods within a single location. Instead of cargo being picked up directly at the piers, it would be brought to the building to be consolidated, where trucks could pick up all their cargo in a single stop. A concurrent project, the West Side Improvement Project, replaced the West Side Line with the original High Line elevated railway, which ran a few blocks away from 111 Eighth Avenue; it began full operation in 1934.

The Port Authority began acquiring the land on the building's site in 1930, against the protests of local residents. Ground was broken in 1931, in a ceremony attended by New York State governor Franklin D. Roosevelt. The building was designed by Lusby Simpson of Abbott, Merkt & Co. and completed in 1932 at a cost of $16 million. Construction required 120,000 cubic yards of concrete, 65 miles of piping, and 12 million bricks. It was formally dedicated on September 16, 1932, though the building was not at that time fully completed. At the time it was the largest building in New York City.

The building had a multipurpose design when it opened, with the first floor and basement designated as "Union Inland Terminal #1", which was to be used to transport goods by truck to and from railroad lines and shipping piers. The building included four truck elevators capable of lifting 20-ton trucks, as well as 12 package elevators and 18 passenger elevators. The second floor was the Commerce section, designed for exhibitions, and the upper floors were intended for manufacturing. Upon opening, the Port Authority leased the terminal to the railroads. The railroads involved were the New York Central Railroad, the Pennsylvania Railroad, the Lehigh Valley Railroad, the Erie Railroad, the Baltimore & Ohio Railroad, the Lackawanna Railroad,  the New York, New Haven & Hartford Railroad, and the Central Railroad of New Jersey. At the time of construction it was estimated to be capable of handling one-third of the 680,000 annual tons of less-than-carload freight at the port. Because of the warehouse mission of the building, it was able to avoid some of the setback rules that greatly reduced the buildable space available for the skyscrapers that mark the Manhattan skyline.

The terminal saw early success in reducing truck traffic to and from the railheads. For instance, on May 25, 1936, 250 trucks brought cargo to the building that was consolidated into only 37 trucks to take to the ferry terminals. The building was home to offices of the Works Progress Administration during the 1930s, as well as offices of the F. W. Woolworth Company. The Commerce Hall hosted the National Business Show for several years in the 1930s. The hall was closed in 1938, and the floor was converted to regular commercial use.

Port Authority Building 
The Port Authority's 1949 report noted a significant decrease in freight handling at the building due to an overall shift in Manhattan from rail to trucks for transporting goods. Around this time, the Port Authority constructed additional inland terminals intended for truck traffic: the New York Union Motor Truck Terminal in 1949 and the Newark Union Motor Truck Terminal in 1950.

A helipad was added to the building in 1951. It was the site of an accident on July 13, 1955, when a Bell 47 helicopter operated by the Port Authority crashed shortly after take-off and fell, in flames, onto the fifteenth floor, where it became stuck. The pilot and his only passenger survived with injuries.

The last of the railroad companies left the building in 1963. It remained the Port Authority's headquarters until it moved to the new World Trade Center in 1973. It was purchased in 1974 by the Sylvan Lawrence Company for $24 million. In 1976, half of the building's space was unlet, a fact attributed to the decline of manufacturing in New York City and the ongoing national recession, though occupancy rebounded to 90percent by 1979. In the following decades, the building attracted a number of a tenants in the computer industry, who were drawn by the large floor space. A center for cancer treatment operated by St. Vincent's Hospital opened in the building in 1999.

1998 Taconic acquisition 
The massive building served as a dwindling warehouse and back-office outpost until 1998, when Taconic Investment Partners acquired it. Taconic began marketing it as a location to be used as a carrier hotel for the new booming internet business. This was coupled with the fashionable rise of the Chelsea neighborhood that surrounded it. Taconic began a renovation program that cost $50 million. By 1999, one-third of the space was leased to telecommunications companies and another one-third to advertising agencies and internet companies, who could afford higher rents than the old industrial tenants. The Eighth and Ninth Avenue lobbies were renovated in 2000 and 2004, respectively. During the Northeast blackout of 2003, the building was able to keep power on, thanks to an underground fuel tank and 37 generators.

In 2006, the Atlantic Theater Company opened a 99-seat black box theater in the building, and Lifetime Entertainment Services became its first cable television tenant. The Google workspace was noted for its campus-like and playful atmosphere, with perks including free food and a game room; The New York Times described it as "a vision of a workplace utopia as conceived by rich, young, single engineers in Silicon Valley, transplanted to Manhattan".

Google ownership 

In 2010, Google contracted to purchase the entire building from Taconic, in a deal reported to be worth around $1.8 billion, the biggest purchase of a U.S. office building of the year. The deal was credited with helping revive the New York City commercial real estate market, which had slumped in the aftermath of the 2007 financial crisis. Taconic continued to manage the building under contract from Google. Since its acquisition, the building has become popularly known as the "Google Building", and it is regarded as the company's East Coast headquarters.

111 Eighth Avenue is adjacent to trunk fiber optic lines stretching from Hudson Street and continuing up Ninth Avenue. That line at the time was owned by Lexent Metro Connect. There was speculation at the time of the acquisition that Google would use its strategic location to launch a Google Fiber operation in New York City. The Google Fiber plan never came to pass, and Google has denied it has any plans to bring it to New York City anytime in the near future, although in 2013 it did begin offering free Wi-Fi to its Chelsea neighbors.  The Lexent dark fiber line has been acquired by Lightower Fiber Networks. The building's meet-me room in its carrier hotel was one of the main network interconnections in the city as of 2006.

In 2013 the first class of the newly created Cornell NYC Tech school began classes in the building, in space donated by Google. Classes continued in the building until the school moved to its new location on Roosevelt Island in 2017. Despite the massive size of the acquisition, Google has still found itself having to rent space elsewhere because it has been unable to break the leases with some of its tenants, including Nike, Deutsch Inc., and Bank of New York. After years of renting additional space across the street in the Chelsea Market, Google purchased that building in 2018.

Google's expansion in Chelsea helped attract other technology companies to the area and contributed to gentrification. The New York Times described Google as drawing "relatively few complaints" in the neighborhood, and New York City Council speaker Corey Johnson called the company "a good neighbor", although some residents blamed it for changing the neighborhood's character and driving out smaller businesses.

See also

 1932 in architecture
 Art Deco architecture of New York City
 List of buildings, sites, and monuments in New York City

Notes

References

External links

 
 The History of 111 Eighth Ave | Greg Estren | Talks at Google

1932 establishments in New York City
Art Deco architecture in Manhattan
Chelsea, Manhattan
Data centers
Eighth Avenue (Manhattan)
Google real estate
Industrial buildings and structures in Manhattan
Internet in the United States
Office buildings completed in 1932
Port Authority of New York and New Jersey
Skyscraper office buildings in Manhattan
Telecommunications buildings in the United States
Warehouses in the United States